Katia Valentina Elliott, also earlier Elliott Bendz, (born 23 April 1970) is a Swedish journalist. Elliott became known as the presenter of the show Go'kväll which was broadcast on SVT in 2002. Since 2006 Katia Elliott works at SVT Nyheter, she works mostly as a science journalist but has also presented several of SVTs news shows. Elliott is an educated dentist after graduating from Karolinska Institutet.  She studied journalism at Stockholm University.

References

1970 births
Living people
Swedish journalists
Karolinska Institute alumni
Stockholm University alumni